Ghulam Mohammad Saznawaz (died 13 February 2014) was the last known master of Kashmiri Sufiyana Music in the world. He opened a school to teach his genre of music, although it did not attract many students from Kashmir because of religious and social prejudice. He was awarded India's fourth highest civilian honour the Padma Shri in 2013. He was also awarded the Sangeet Natak Akademi Award in 1998 for his contribution to Sufiana Kalam of Kashmir. He died in 2014 in Srinagar at the age of 74.

References

External links
 
 SaMaPa Sher-e-Kashmir Sheikh Mohd. Abdullah Award 2008 

Kashmiri people
2014 deaths
Indian Sufis
Performers of Sufi music
Recipients of the Padma Shri in arts
Recipients of the Sangeet Natak Akademi Award
1940 births